Biostraticola is a Gram-negative, rod-shaped, non-endospore-forming, facultatively anaerobic and motile genus of bacteria within the family of Pectobacteriaceae with one known species (Biostraticola tofi).

References

Pectobacteriaceae
Monotypic bacteria genera